Zhalan may refer to:
 Zhalan Rashid
 Zhalan Tappeh Kakeh Aziz

Zhalan means "fence" and is part of the name of the Zhalan Cemetery in Beijing.